Muhammad bin Tughluq was the eighteenth sultan of the Delhi Sultanate.

Muhammad bin Tughluq may also refer to:

 Muhammad bin Tughluq (play), a 1968 play by Cho Ramaswamy
 Muhammad bin Tughluq (1971 film), a 1971 film by Cho Ramaswamy
 Muhammad bin Tughluq (1972 film), a 1972 film by B. V. Prasad
 Muhammad Bin Tughlaq: Tale of a Tyrant, a historical fiction novel by Anuja Chandramouli